Natacha Bouchart (born 29 May 1963) is a French politician of the Republicans (LR) and formerly Union for a Popular Movement (UMP).

Life and career
Bouchart was born at Lens.  She has served as Mayor of Calais since 2008 and was elected to represent Pas-de-Calais in the French Senate in 2011.

Ahead of the Republicans' 2016 presidential primary, Bouchart endorsed Nicolas Sarkozy as the party's candidate for the 2017 French presidential election.

Ahead of the 2022 presidential elections, Bouchart publicly declared her support for incumbent Emmanuel Macron and criticized the Republicans’ candidate Valérie Pécresse.

References

External links
  Mairie-calais.fr

1963 births
Living people
Union for a Popular Movement politicians
The Republicans (France) politicians
Politicians from Hauts-de-France
French Senators of the Fifth Republic
People from Calais
French people of Armenian descent
Mayors of places in Hauts-de-France
Women mayors of places in France
Calais migrant crisis (1999–present)
20th-century French women politicians
21st-century French women politicians
Women members of the Senate (France)
Senators of Pas-de-Calais